Pedro Efraín Alegre Sasiain (born 18 January 1963) is a Paraguayan politician. He was the President of the Chamber of Deputies from 1999 to 2000. From August 2008 to June 2011, he served as the Minister of Public Works and Communications in the Fernando Lugo cabinet. He was the presidential candidate of the Authentic Radical Liberal Party in the April 2013 elections. He placed second behind Horacio Cartes, with 39% of the vote. He ran again in 2018, coming second to Mario Abdo Benítez with 45% of the vote. He is currently running for a third, consecutive time in 2023. From 2016, he is president of the Authentic Radical Liberal Party.

References

External links
 Official 2013 campaign website (via Wayback Machine)

1963 births
Living people
People from Misiones Department
Paraguayan people of Spanish descent
Authentic Radical Liberal Party politicians
Government ministers of Paraguay
Presidents of the Chamber of Deputies of Paraguay
20th-century Paraguayan lawyers
Universidad Católica Nuestra Señora de la Asunción alumni
University of Salamanca alumni